Omutnaya is a rural locality (a settlement) in Verkh-Kamyshensky Selsoviet, Zarinsky District, Altai Krai, Russia. The population was 36 as of 2013. There are 3 streets.

Geography 
Omutnaya is located 10 km southwest of Zarinsk (the district's administrative centre) by road. Batunny is the nearest rural locality.

References 

Rural localities in Zarinsky District